The Carmel Fire Station, also known as Station No. 15, is a historic two-story fire station in downtown Carmel-by-the-Sea, California. The firehouse is an example of Modern Civic and  WPA style architecture. The fire station qualified as an important building in the city's downtown historic district property survey and was registered with the California Register of Historical Resources on April 25, 2002. The Carmel fire station is still in operation.

History

A volunteer Carmel fire department was established in 1908 by twenty citizens that was led by Robert George Leidig (1879-1970). Leidig was one of the early founders of the Carmel Volunteer Fire Department. He became chief of the department in January 1925 and served as the village fire marshal and chief for 53 years.

In 1916, when the city was incorporated, they became responsible for fire protection. In 1935 a bond was issued by the city to build a new firehouse. The bond was for $12,000, with a pledge from the Works Progress Administration (WPA) to add another $9,046 for the new building.

The Carmel Fire Station is a two-story Reinforced concrete Modern and WPA style architecture located on 6th Avenue, between San Carolos and Mission Streets, in Carmel-by-the-Sea, California. The firehouse was designed by local architect Milton Latham and built by master builder Michael J. Murphy and the WPA supervisor Bernard Rountree. Blacksmith Francis Whitaker completed the five engine bay doors and inside iron handrails. The front is covered with a Carmel stone Façade. The station was opened in June 1937. A bronze commemorative plaque appears near the entryway door.

The building qualified for inclusion in the city's Downtown Historic District Property Survey, and was registered with the California Register of Historical Resources on April 25, 2002. The building qualifies under the California Register criterion 1, in history as the home of the Carmel-by-the-Sea Fire Department, and criterion 3 in architecture, as an example of civic architecture constructed with support of the WPA during the Great Depression in the 1930s.

The Monterey Fire Department staffs the Carmel Fire Station. The department has six fire stations in the cities of Monterey, Pacific Grove, and Carmel-by-the-Sea. The Carmel Fire Station is station No. 15.

See also
 Carmel-by-the-Sea, California

References

External links

 Downtown Conservation District Historic Property Survey
 City of Carmel, Police & Fire

1937 establishments in California
Carmel-by-the-Sea, California
Buildings and structures in Monterey County, California